Regulate the Chemicals is an album by indie rock band Twothirtyeight.  The album was originally released in 2000 through Takehold Records.  It was pressed on vinyl by the now-defunct BlessedKilling Records in 2001.  When Twothirtyeight signed to Tooth & Nail Records, Regulate the Chemicals was re-released with the songs "The Sticks Are Woven In The Spokes" and "Les Wirth". Chris Carrabba contributed backing vocals on the album.

The album was re-released on vinyl in 2009 by Recession Records.

Track listing
 "The Hands of Men"
 "There Is No Dana"
 "Coin-Laundry Loser"
 "This Town Will Eat You"
 "The Bastard Son and the Spoiled One"
 "Moving Too Far"
 "Songs Will Write the Words"
 "Ears and Fingers"
 "Indian in Your Eyes"

Track listing (reissue)
 "The Hands of Men"
 "There Is No Dana"
 "Coin-Laundry Loser"
 "The Sticks Are Woven in the Spokes"
 "This Town Will Eat You"
 "The Spoiled One"
 "Les Wirth"
 "Moving Too Far"
 "Songs Will Write the Words"
 "Ears and Fingers"
 "Indian in Your Eyes"

External links
Regulate the Chemicals at Discogs

References

Twothirtyeight albums
2000 albums
2002 albums
Tooth & Nail Records albums
Albums produced by James Paul Wisner